Oxford cloth is a type of woven dress shirt fabric, employed to make dress shirts sometimes called Oxford shirts worn on casual to formal occasions.

Structure
Oxford cloth has a basket-weave structure and a lustrous aspect making it a popular fabric for dress shirts.

Varieties
Plain Oxford and Pinpoint Oxford are commonly used for casual shirt designs such as a button-down collar. Pinpoint Oxford is made from finer yarn and has a tighter weave than plain Oxford. It shows a "pin" or "dot" effect in the texture. Royal Oxford is considered a more formal option. It is suited to business or sporty dress codes.

References

Woven fabrics